Bergen Blues Band (1974 - 1984) was a Norwegian blues band from Bergen, Norway.

Biography 
The band was founded and led by John Magnar Bernes (vocalist and harmonica player, alias «Hungry John»), along with Per Jørgensen on guitar (replaced by Ole Thomsen in 1981), Kåre Sandvik on piano (1974–81), Edvard Askeland bass (replaced by Rune Rønning in 1981, and later Atle Mjørlaug 1983), and Frank Jakobsen drums (replaced by Willy Korneliussen in 1976). Zoltan Vincze joined the band together with Per Jørgensen in 1983.

Discography 
1980: Bergen Blues Band (Harvest Records)
1982: Another Blues (Harvest Records)
1983: Blues Hit Me (EMI)

Compilations
2009: The Best of Bergen Blues Band (Hungry Records)

References

External links 
Bergen Blues Band "Meanest blues in town" on YouTube
 

Musical groups from Bergen
Musical groups established in 1974
1974 establishments in Norway
Musical groups disestablished in 1984
1984 disestablishments in Norway